Ichinowatari Dam is a gravity dam located in Aomori Prefecture in Japan. The dam is used for power production. The catchment area of the dam is 129.2 km2. The dam impounds about 1  ha of land when full and can store 28 thousand cubic meters of water. The construction of the dam was started on 1930 and completed in 1931.

References

Dams in Aomori Prefecture
1931 establishments in Japan